This article lists feature-length British films and full-length documentaries that have their premieres in 2017 and were at least partly made by Great Britain or the United Kingdom. It does not feature short films, medium-length films, made-for-TV films, pornographic films, filmed theater, VR films and interactive films. It does not include films screened in previous years that had official release dates in 2017.

Also included is an overview of the major events in British film, including awards ceremonies, as well as a list of notable British film artists who died in 2017.

Film premieres

January – March

April – June

July – September

October – December

Other premieres

Culturally British films 
The following list comprises films not produced by Great Britain or the United Kingdom but is strongly associated with British culture. The films in this list should fulfill at least 3 of the following criteria:
 The film is adapted from a British source material.
 The story is set, at least partially, in the United Kingdom.
 The film was shot, at least partially, in the United Kingdom.
 Many of the film's cast and crew members are British.

British award winners 

Listed here are the British winners and nominees at the three most prestigious film award ceremonies in the English-speaking world: the Academy Awards, British Academy Film Awards and Golden Globe Awards, that were held during 2017, celebrating the best films of 2016. The British nominations were led by Lion, with Fantastic Beasts and Where to Find Them and Florence Foster Jenkins going on to win a number of technical awards. British films did, however, notably lose out to Moonlight and La La Land from the United States.

Academy Awards 
The 89th Academy Awards honoring the best films of 2016 were held on February 26, 2017.

British winners:
 Fantastic Beasts and Where to Find Them (Best Costume Design)
 The White Helmets (Best Documentary – Short Subject)
 Anne V. Coates (Academy Honorary Award)
 Joanna Natasegara (Best Documentary – Short Subject) – The White Helmets
 Orlando von Einsiedel (Best Documentary – Short Subject) – The White Helmets

British nominees:
 Allied (Best Costume Design)
 Fantastic Beasts and Where to Find Them (Best Production Design)
 Florence Foster Jenkins (Best Actress, Best Costume Design)
 Hail, Caesar! (Best Production Design)
 Lion (Best Picture, Best Supporting Actor, Best Supporting Actress, Best Adapted Screenplay, Best Original Score, Best Cinematography)
 The Lobster (Best Original Screenplay)
 Loving (Best Actress)
 Pear Cider and Cigarettes (Best Animated Short Film)
 Silence (Best Cinematography)
 Watani: My Homeland (Best Documentary – Short Subject)
 Andrew Garfield (Best Actor) – Hacksaw Ridge
 Anna Pinnock (Best Production Design) – Fantastic Beasts and Where to Find Them
 Cara Speller (Best Animated Short Film) – Pear Cider and Cigarettes
 Dev Patel (Best Supporting Actor) – Lion
 Guy Hendrix Dyas (Best Production Design) – Passengers
 Iain Canning (Best Picture) – Lion
 Jake Roberts (Best Film Editing) – Hell or High Water
 Joanna Johnston (Best Costume Design) – Allied
 Joe Walker (Best Film Editing) – Arrival
 Mika Levi (Best Original Score) – Jackie
 Naomie Harris (Best Supporting Actress) – Moonlight
 Oliver Jones (Best Special Effects) – Kubo and the Two Strings
 Neil Corbould (Best Visual Effects) – Rogue One: A Star Wars Story
 Paul Corbould (Best Visual Effects) – Doctor Strange
 Richard Bluff (Best Visual Effects) – Doctor Strange
 Stephen Ellis (Best Documentary – Short Subject) – Watani: My Homeland
 Sting (Best Original Song) – "The Empty Chair" for Jim: The James Foley Story
 Stuart Craig (Best Production Design) – Fantastic Beasts and Where to Find Them
 Stuart Wilson (Best Sound Mixing) – Rogue One: A Star Wars Story

British Academy Film Awards 
The 70th British Academy Film Awards honoring the best films of 2016 were held on February 12, 2017.

British winners:
 Fantastic Beasts and Where to Find Them (Best Production Design)
 Florence Foster Jenkins (Best Makeup and Hair)
 Home (Best Short Film)
 I, Daniel Blake (Outstanding British Film)
 Lion (Best Actor in a Supporting Role, Best Adapted Screenplay)
 Under the Shadow (Outstanding Debut by a British Writer, Director or Producer)
 Curzon Cinemas (Outstanding British Contribution to Cinema)
 Anna Pinnock (Best Production Design) – Fantastic Beasts and Where to Find Them
 Dev Patel (Best Actor in a Supporting Role) – Lion
 Hugh Grant (Best Actor in a Supporting Role) – Florence Foster Jenkins
 Ken Loach (Outstanding British Film) – I, Daniel Blake
 Paul Laverty (Outstanding British Film) – I, Daniel Blake
 Stuart Craig (Best Production Design) – Fantastic Beasts and Where to Find Them
 Tom Holland (EE Rising Star Award)

British nominees:
 Allied (Best Costume Design)
 American Honey (Outstanding British Film)
 The Beatles: Eight Days a Week (Best Documentary)
 Denial (Outstanding British Film)
 Hail, Caesar! (Best Production Design)
 I, Daniel Blake (Best Film, Best Director, Best Actress in a Supporting Role, Best Original Screenplay)
 Fantastic Beasts and Where to Find Them (Outstanding British Film, Best Sound, Best Special Visual Effects, Best Costume Design)
 Florence Foster Jenkins (Best Actress in a Leading Role, Best Actor in a Supporting Role, Best Costume Design)
 Lion (Best Actor in a Supporting Role, Best Actress in a Supporting Role, Best Original Music)
 Notes on Blindness (Outstanding Debut by a British Writer, Director or Producer, Outstanding British Film, Best Documentary)
 Amanda Knight (Best Makeup and Hair) – Rogue One: A Star Wars Story
 Andrea Arnold (Outstanding British Film) – American Honey
 Anya Taylor-Joy (EE Rising Star Award)
 David Hare (Outstanding British Film) – Denial
 David Heyman (Outstanding British Film) – Fantastic Beasts and Where to Find Them
 David Yates (Outstanding British Film) – Fantastic Beasts and Where to Find Them
 Glenn Freemantle (Best Sound) – Fantastic Beasts and Where to Find Them
 Ian Tapp (Best Sound) – Fantastic Beasts and Where to Find Them
 J. K. Rowling (Outstanding British Film) – Fantastic Beasts and Where to Find Them
 Joanna Johnston (Best Costume Design) – Allied
 Joe Walker (Best Editing) – Arrival
 Lionel Wigram (Outstanding British Film) – Fantastic Beasts and Where to Find Them
 Lisa Tomblin (Best Makeup and Hair) – Rogue One: A Star Wars Story
 Mika Levi (Best Original Music) – Jackie
 Mike Prestwood Smith (Best Sound) – Deepwater Horizon
 Neil Corbould (Best Special Visual Effects) – Rogue One: A Star Wars Story
 Paul Corbould (Best Special Visual Effects) – Doctor Strange
 Richard Bluff (Best Special Visual Effects) – Doctor Strange
 Samir Mehanović (Best Short Film) – Mouth of Hell
 Simon Hayes (Best Sound) – Fantastic Beasts and Where to Find Them
 Tim Burke (Best Special Visual Effects) – Fantastic Beasts and Where to Find Them

Golden Globe Awards 
The 74th Golden Globe Awards honoring the best films of 2016 were held on January 8, 2017.

British winner:
 Aaron Taylor-Johnson (Best Supporting Actor in a Motion Picture) – Nocturnal Animals

British nominees:
 Florence Foster Jenkins (Best Motion Picture – Musical or Comedy, Best Actor in a Motion Picture – Musical or Comedy, Best Actress in a Motion Picture – Musical or Comedy, Best Supporting Actor in a Motion Picture)
 Lion (Best Motion Picture – Drama, Best Supporting Actor in a Motion Picture, Best Supporting Actress in a Motion Picture, Best Original Score)
 The Lobster (Best Actor in a Motion Picture – Musical or Comedy)
 Loving (Best Actor in a Motion Picture – Drama, Best Actress in a Motion Picture – Drama)
 Sing Street (Best Motion Picture – Musical or Comedy)
 Andrew Garfield (Best Actor in a Motion Picture – Drama) – Hacksaw Ridge
 Benjamin Wallfisch (Best Original Score) – Hidden Figures
 Daniel Pemberton (Best Original Song)  – "Gold" for Gold
 Hugh Grant (Best Actor in a Motion Picture – Musical or Comedy) – Florence Foster Jenkins
 Lily Collins (Best Actress in a Motion Picture – Musical or Comedy) – Rules Don't Apply
 Naomie Harris (Best Supporting Actress in a Motion Picture) – Moonlight

Notable deaths

See also 
Lists of British films
2017 in film
2017 in British music
2017 in British radio
2017 in British television
2017 in the United Kingdom
List of 2017 box office number-one films in the United Kingdom
List of British films of 2016
List of British films of 2018

Notes

References

External links
 

2017
Lists of 2017 films by country or language